William Floyd Gilliland (December 17, 1890 – September 5, 1961) was a politician from Alberta, Canada. He served in the Legislative Assembly of Alberta from 1944 until his death in 1961, as a member of the governing Social Credit caucus.

Early life
Gilliland was a farmer in the Peace River district for thirty years before running for public office.

Political career
Gilliland first ran for a seat in the Albert Legislature in the 1944 general election. He was nominated as the Social Credit candidate in Peace River on the second count at a convention held in Grimshaw, Alberta on March 2, 1944.  Gilliland took over 50% of the vote to defeat incumbent independent Eld Martin and two other candidates.

In the 1948 general election Gilliland defeated two other candidates with over 60% of the popular vote. Of the eleven MLAs who represented Peace River until 1948 he was the only one to win a second term in office.

In the 1952 general election Gilliland rolled up a very large majority over two other candidates.  In the 1955 general election he won over 50% of the popular vote to hold his district.

In the 1959 general election Gilliland defeated two other candidates with over 60% of the popular vote.

Gilliland suffered a heart attack at the 1961 Social Credit national convention in Ottawa. He died later that year while hospitalized in Edmonton.

References

External links
Legislative Assembly of Alberta Members Listing

1890s births
1961 deaths
Alberta Social Credit Party MLAs